Stephen Joseph McGroarty (1830 – January 2, 1870) was an Irish American soldier who served in the Union Army during the American Civil War.

Biography

Early life
McGroarty was born in Mountcharles, Donegal, Ireland, in 1830 and died in College Hill, Ohio on January 2, 1870. He migrated to the United States at the age of three. His parents settled in Cincinnati, Ohio, where he was educated in St. Francis Xavier College. After graduation he engaged in the dry-goods business in partnership with an uncle, but left it at the end of five years to study law. He was admitted to the bar and began practice at Toledo, but subsequently returned to Cincinnati, where he achieved a reputation as a criminal lawyer.

Military career
When the civil war began he raised a company of Irish Americans and served with them in the 10th Ohio Infantry under William Haines Lytle for three months, afterwards re-enlisting in the 10th for three years. At the Battle of Carnifex Ferry he received a gunshot wound through the right lung. As soon as he recovered he returned to the field and was appointed colonel of the 50th Ohio Infantry by the Governor of Ohio David Tod. The 50th was afterward merged into the 61st, and he commanded the latter till the end of the war. At the Battle of Peachtree Creek on July 20, 1864 his left arm was shattered at the elbow by a minié ball in the beginning of the engagement, yet he remained with his men through the fight. He was accustomed to expose his life with the utmost hardihood, and during the war received twenty-three wounds. He was brevetted brigadier-general of volunteers on May 1, 1865. He was for two years collector of internal revenue, and just before his death, which resulted from injuries received in battle, was elected clerk of the Hamilton County, Ohio courts.

He was originally buried at Old St. Joseph's Cemetery in the Price Hill neighborhood of Cincinnati, Ohio but was moved to Spring Grove Cemetery in Cincinnati in 1912 to be next to his wife.

References

Attribution

External links

1830 births
1870 deaths
19th-century Irish people
19th-century American people
Irish emigrants to the United States (before 1923)
Irish soldiers in the United States Army
Union Army colonels
Burials at Spring Grove Cemetery
People from County Donegal